Anya’s Tutorial is a 2022 Indian Telugu-language psychological thriller directed by Pallavi Gangireddy in her directorial debut. It stars Regina Cassandra, Nivedhithaa Sathish, and Prassadh in lead roles. The series was produced by Shobhu Yarlagadda under the banner of Arka Media, with cinematography by Vijay K. Chakravathy and music by Arrol Corelli. It premiered on Aha on 1 July 2022.

Cast

Main 

 Regina Cassandra
 Nivedhithaa Sathish
 Prassadh
 Sameer Malla

Recurring 

 Anuj Gurwara
 Phalguni Naidu
 Sriteja Prassadh
 Lavanya Reddy

Reception

Critical response 
Sangeetha Devi Dundoo of The Hindu in her review stated that "The series leaves questions unanswered, with ample scope for the story to be continued in Season Two. Not all of Anya’s Tutorial is convincing or absorbing, but as it progresses, it emerges as one of the better series in the Telugu-Tamil digital space."

Paul Nicodemus of The Times of India rated the series 3.0/5 and wrote "The plot had enough to engage the audience with its layered past and present narration, but some might find it confusing and leaves room for ambiguity, unlike what’s written on Anya’s social media bio Things are simple; do not complicate them."

Ram Venkat Srikar of Cine Express gave the series 3 stars out of five and wrote "Anya’s Tutorial, as a horror show, posits some interesting ideas on the table and comes close to realising some of them. A tense atmosphere from start to finish, however, ensures that it holds our attention as the horror unravels before fizzling out towards the end."

A reviewer for ABP Live rated the series 2/5, stating "The cast, high production values ​​and music are impressive. Even if the story disappoints...the making and taking are top class, so it engages to some extent."

Akanksha Senugupta of The Print in her review stated "Despite a stellar cast and convincing performances by Nivedithaa Satish and Regina Cassandra, the storyline simply ruptures."

References

External links 
 

Telugu-language web series
Indian psychological thriller films